The Workers' Revolutionary Party (PRT) is a left-wing Nicaraguan political party with Marxist and Trotskyist tendencies founded 1971 by students including Bonifacio Miranda.

Originally a broad Marxist group named Towards a Popular Revolution, the party joined the Trotskyist United Secretariat of the Fourth International in 1975 and renamed itself the Marxist Revolutionary League.  It fought alongside the Sandinista National Liberation Front, but after their victory, remained illegal and its leaders were jailed for criticising the new government.

The group renamed itself to PRT in 1984, and received legal status after 1984 elections.

References
Charles D. Ameringer, Political Parties of the Americas, 1980s to 1990s

1971 establishments in Nicaragua
Communist parties in Nicaragua
Formerly banned communist parties
Organizations of the Nicaraguan Revolution
Political parties established in 1971
Political parties in Nicaragua
Trotskyist organizations in North America